General Dillon may refer to:

Arthur Dillon (1750–1794), Kingdom of France general
Francis R. Dillon (fl. 1960s–2020s), U.S. Air Force brigadier general
Martin Andrew Dillon (1826–1913), British Army general

See also
Kanwal Jeet Singh Dhillon (fl. 1980s–2020s), Indian Army lieutenant general
Attorney General Dillon (disambiguation)